To Rob a Thief (Spanish: Ladrón que Roba a Ladrón) is a 2007 Spanish-language film in which two thieves reunite to rob a television mogul.  The sequel Ladrones was released in 2015.

Plot
Two thieves plan to rob a businessman who has defrauded many poor families. When none of their affiliates want to go undercover as day laborers to pull off the heist, the two men turn to the real thing for help. Emilio, a Colombian con man, arrives in LA with two weeks to complete his plan to rob a former colleague, Claudio Silvestrini who now poses as Moctezuma Valdéz, who's made a fortune using infomercials to peddle snake oil to Latin immigrants. Emilio's friend Alejandro, who sells pirated DVDs, has assembled a team of amateurs, who, as Alejandro says, will go unnoticed because they're immigrants. The team must gain entry to Silvestrini's well-guarded mansion, steal two keys to access a vault, and then get the money off the property. A father and his tomboy daughter, a nervous Cuban actor, a techie, and a muscle man make up the team, plus Alejandro has been courting Silvestrini's nanny, Gloria. Silvestrini recognizes Alejandro to be a thief and leads Gloria to break up with Alejandro. In the end, it is revealed that Gloria was a spy that Alejandro had implanted without any of the crew knowing. In fact, Gloria is Alejandro's wife.

Cast
 Fernando Colunga as Alejandro Toledo
 Miguel Varoni as Emilio Lopez
 Saúl Lisazo as Moctesuma 'Mocte' Valdez
 Ivonne Montero as Rafaela
 Oscar Torre as Miguelito
 Ruben Garfias as Rafa
 Gabriel Soto as Aníbal Cano
 Julie Gonzalo as Gloria / Dora
 JoJo Henrickson as Julio Miranda
 Sonya Smith as Veronica Valdez
 Lidia Pires as Blanca
 Richard Azurdia as Primitivo
 Art Bonilla as Coyote

Reception
Ladrón que Roba a Ladrón has received generally favorable reviews. It holds a 64% rating on Rotten Tomatoes based on reviews from 28 critics. On Metacritic it has a score of 61 out of 100 based on 11 reviews.

Release
Ladrón que Roba a Ladrón had a limited release on August 31, 2007 in the United States.

Notes

External links
 
 

Spanish action adventure films
2000s Spanish-language films
Films about immigration
Lionsgate films
2000s Spanish films
Spanish crime comedy films